Opisthedeicta is a genus of moths of the family Crambidae. It contains only one species, Opisthedeicta poritialis, which is found in south-eastern India, Sri Lanka and on Sumatra.

References

Natural History Museum Lepidoptera genus database

Acentropinae
Crambidae genera
Taxa named by William Warren (entomologist)